Juan José Sánchez Maqueda (born 23 January 1969) is a Spanish retired footballer who played as a midfielder, and was most recently the manager of Saudi Arabian club Al-Kawkab.

He amassed La Liga totals of 110 matches and six goals over seven seasons, representing mainly Real Madrid. In 2011, he became a manager.

Playing career
Born in Madrid, Maqueda spent 16 years with Real Madrid youth and reserve sides comprised. He made his La Liga debut on 2 January 1988 still not aged 19, playing the full 90 minutes in a 2–1 home win against FC Barcelona. Late in the same month he scored his first goal with the main squad, in a 4–0 victory over Cádiz CF also at the Santiago Bernabéu Stadium.

Maqueda returned to Real in the summer of 1990, after a season-long loan with CD Logroñés. He contributed 24 games – 19 starts – and one goal in the first year upon his return, but the team ranked in third place. He added three appearances in the European Cup, netting in the 4–1 away defeat of Odense Boldklub on 18 September 1990.

Maqueda spent nearly two years on the sidelines due to an anterior cruciate ligament injury, from which he never fully recovered. After leaving the Merengues, he subsequently played with six clubs in as many years, appearing for Valencia CF and Albacete Balompié in the top flight and having abroad stints with C.D. Irapuato and Panionios FC. He retired in 2000, at 31.

Coaching career
Maqueda spent six years as assistant manager to Juan Ramón López Caro, with the pair being in charge of Real Madrid and Levante UD in the top tier and RC Celta de Vigo in Segunda División. They worked for a few months with FC Vaslui, leaving in October 2010.

Maqueda began working as a head coach in 2011, with Al Ittihad Alexandria Club in Egypt. Two years later, in October, he replaced Ahmad Al-Ajlani at the helm of Saudi Arabian club Al-Shoulla FC.

On 27 May 2014, Maqueda was appointed at Al Fateh SC. He returned to the African nation in December, signing for Al Masry SC.

On 2 November 2019, Maqueda returned to manage Al-Shoulla for a second time. He left the club on 28 June 2020 whilst the season was put on hold due to the COVID-19 pandemic.

Honours

Player
Real Madrid
La Liga: 1987–88, 1988–89
Copa del Rey: 1988–89
Supercopa de España: 1988, 1990

References

External links

1969 births
Living people
Footballers from Madrid
Spanish footballers
Association football midfielders
La Liga players
Segunda División players
Segunda División B players
Real Madrid Castilla footballers
Real Madrid CF players
CD Logroñés footballers
Valencia CF players
Albacete Balompié players
Racing de Ferrol footballers
CF Fuenlabrada footballers
Irapuato F.C. footballers
Super League Greece players
Panionios F.C. players
Spanish expatriate footballers
Expatriate footballers in Mexico
Expatriate footballers in Greece
Spanish expatriate sportspeople in Mexico
Spanish expatriate sportspeople in Greece
Spanish football managers
Egyptian Premier League managers
Al Ittihad Alexandria Club managers
Al Masry SC managers
Saudi Professional League managers
Al-Shoulla FC managers
Al-Fateh SC managers
Saudi First Division League managers
Spanish expatriate football managers
Expatriate football managers in Egypt
Expatriate football managers in Saudi Arabia
Spanish expatriate sportspeople in Egypt
Spanish expatriate sportspeople in Saudi Arabia